The word  is derived from Old English byht (“bend, angle, corner; bay, bight”). In modern English, bight may refer to:
 Bight (geography), recess of a coast, bay, or other curved feature
 Bight (knot), a curved section, slack part, or loop in rope (used in the terminology of knot-tying)

See also

 Canto Bight, a fictional city in Star Wars: The Last Jedi
 Bite (disambiguation)
 Byte (disambiguation)
 Byte, a unit of digital information in computing and telecommunications